Gastone Ettore Paganelli (died 1575) was a Roman Catholic prelate who served as Bishop of Gravina di Puglia (1574–1575).

Biography
In 1574, Gastone Ettore Paganelli was appointed during the papacy of Pope Gregory XIII as Bishop of Gravina di Puglia.
He served as Bishop of Gravina di Puglia until his death in 1575.

References

External links and additional sources
 (for Chronology of Bishops) 
 (for Chronology of Bishops) 

16th-century Italian Roman Catholic bishops
Bishops appointed by Pope Gregory XIII
1575 deaths